Arbuckle House may refer to:

United States
Alexander W. Arbuckle I House, historic home located near Lewisburg, Greenbrier County, West Virginia, NRHP-listed
Arbuckle Place, Assawoman, Virginia, NRHP-listed
George Arbuckle House, Salt Lake City, Utah, NRHP-listed
John E. Arbuckle House, historic home located at Glenville, Gilmer County, West Virginia, NRHP-listed

See also
Arbuckle (disambiguation)